Carry Me Back to Morningside Heights is an American play about a young Jewish man who insists on becoming a slave to an African-American law student as a personal penance for the years of wrongs whites have done to blacks.

The 1968 Broadway production was directed by Sidney Poitier and featured Louis Gossett Jr., Diane Ladd and Cicely Tyson. It ran for seven performances.

The play was profiled in the William Goldman book The Season: A Candid Look at Broadway.

References

External links
 

1968 plays
Broadway plays
Plays about race and ethnicity
Comedy plays